Suzani is a personal name coming from the variations of Suzane and Suzana, meaning "tribal beautiful" in Aramaic.

Suzani may also refer to:

Suzani (textile), an embroidered tribal textile made in Central Asia
Suzani, Shamseddin Taj-ul Shu'ara, a 12th-century Persian poet from Samarqand